Reg-Hack Muller (born 6 March 1986) is a South African professional rugby union player who most recently played with the . His regular position is flanker or eighth man.

Career

Youth / Sharks

After finishing high school, Muller moved to Durban to join the Sharks Academy. He played for both the s and the s in the respective Provincial Championships in 2005 and for the Under-21s in 2006 (as well as Sevens.

They eventually finished in fifth position and missed out on a quarter final spot. Muller returned to action for the Sharks U21s in the 2007 Under-21 Provincial Championship later in the year.

Falcons

In 2008, Muller returned to Gauteng, joining the East Rand-based . In his fourth appearance for the Falcons, Muller scored his first try for the side; he scored in the final minutes of the match in Uniondale, with the Falcons eventually winning the match 27–26.

Muller also made his Currie Cup debut in the same year. He made a total of four starts and four appearances off the bench in their 14-match season, scoring one try in their return match against the Boland Cavaliers in Wellington. However, they lost both legs of the play-offs series – 24–29 and 19–27 respectively, with Muller starting both matches – to be relegated to the First Division for 2009.

Muller featured in a Compulsory Friendly match against  ahead of the 2009 Currie Cup First Division, which saw the Falcons lose all ten of their matches to finish bottom of the log. Despite the poor results, Muller was one of the best players during the Falcons' season, scoring six tries in six appearances – the joint-highest by a Falcons player.

Muller made six appearances as the Falcons again lost all their matches in the 2010 Vodacom Cup and a further five in the 2010 Currie Cup First Division.

Muller again scored two tries against the Border Bulldogs in East London during the 2011 Vodacom Cup, helping his side to a 43–15 victory as the Falcons eventually finished in sixth spot on the log, with two victories and a draw.

Mâcon

Muller joined French Fédérale 1 side Mâcon for the 2014–2015 Fédérale 1 season.

Return to Falcons

Muller returned to the Falcons in 2015 and was named in their squad for the 2015 Currie Cup First Division.

Sevens

Muller also played Sevens rugby; he represented the  Sevens team in 2006 and 2007 and also represented the South Africa Sevens side in the Namibia Sevens tournament in 2009. He was a member of the Kaizer Chiefs side that played at the 7s Premier League in 2013 and played for Samurai Sevens and the  Sevens teams in 2014.

Statistics

References

South African rugby union players
Living people
1986 births
People from Johannesburg
Rugby union flankers
Rugby union number eights
Falcons (rugby union) players
Sharks (Currie Cup) players
South Africa international rugby sevens players